Frank Albert Kaufman (March 4, 1916 – July 31, 1997) was a United States district judge of the United States District Court for the District of Maryland.

Education and career

Born in Baltimore, Maryland, Kaufman received a Bachelor of Arts degree from Dartmouth College in 1937 and a Bachelor of Laws from Harvard Law School in 1940. He was an attorney of the Office of the General Counsel of the United States Department of the Treasury from 1940 to 1941. He was an attorney of the Office of the General Counsel of the Lend Lease Administration from 1941 to 1942. He was United States Lend Lease representative in Turkey from 1942 to 1943. He was assistant to the Chief of the Psychological Warfare Board of the Allied Force Headquarters from 1943 to 1944. He was Chief of the Leaflet Division of the Psychological Warfare Division of the Supreme Headquarters Allied Expeditionary Force from 1944 to 1945. He was assistant to the general counsel of the Foreign Economic Administration in 1945. He was in private practice in Baltimore from 1945 to 1966. He was a consultant for the Psychological Warfare Department of the United States Army in Washington, D.C., from 1951 to 1953. He was a Lecturer for the University of Baltimore School of Law from 1948 to 1962. He was a Lecturer for the University of Maryland School of Law from 1953 to 1954.

Federal judicial service

Kaufman was nominated by President Lyndon B. Johnson on September 9, 1966, to the United States District Court for the District of Maryland, to a new seat created by 80 Stat. 75. He was confirmed by the United States Senate on September 22, 1966, and received his commission the same day. He served as Chief Judge from 1981 to 1986. He was a member of the Judicial Conference of the United States from 1985 to 1991. He assumed senior status on June 16, 1986. Kaufman served in that capacity until his death on July 31, 1997, in Baltimore.

References

Sources
 

1916 births
1997 deaths
Dartmouth College alumni
Harvard Law School alumni
Judges of the United States District Court for the District of Maryland
United States district court judges appointed by Lyndon B. Johnson
20th-century American judges
20th-century American lawyers